Marabou is a term of Haitian origin denoting multiracial admixture. The term, which comes originally from the African Marabouts, describes the offspring of a Haitian person of mixed race: European, African, Taíno and South Asian.

The Marabou label dates to the colonial period of Haiti's history, meaning the offspring of a mulatto  and a griffe person. However, Médéric-Louis-Elie Moreau de Saint-Méry, in his three-volume work on the colony, describes Marabous as the product of the union of a black and a quadroon; he says nothing concerning East Indians.

See also
 Indo-African (disambiguation)
 Dougla people
 Zambo

References

Afro-Caribbean
Asian Caribbean
Indo-Caribbean
Ethnic groups in Haiti
Haitian people of Asian descent
Multiracial affairs in the Caribbean
People of African descent
People of Saint-Domingue